Kastania (Greek: Καστάνια) is a village in Mesa Mani of Laconia, Greece. An independent community since 1912, it became part of the municipality Sminos in 1997, which in turn became part of the municipality East Mani in 2010.

Geography
Kastania is 28 km northwestern of Gytheio at the southeastern slopes of mount Taygetos. The village is also named locally Kastanitza (Greek: Καστανίτζα) or Mikri Kastania (Greek: Μικρή Καστάνια). Within the village is the historic Church of the Metamorphosis. At the village entrance is an impressive war memorial. A short distance below the village is the early Christian chapel of Ayios Stratiyas. Overlooking the village from its mountainous perch is the impressive Monastery of Panayia Yiatrissa.

History
In 1770, after the Orlov Revolt failed, the Ottomans wanted to punish the Klephts for their support of it. In siege of Kastania, the Ottoman commander Ali Bey sieged the two Maniot pyrgoi (fighting towers) which belonged to the Venetsanakis clan. With them was the father of the hero of the Greek War of Independence, Theodoros Kolokotronis, Konstantinos Kolokotronis and his wife who was pregnant with his son. Ali Bey laid siege to the pyrgoi. After holding out for three days the defenders burst out of the pyrgoi's doors and charged the Ottomans. Only a few cut through the Ottoman lines. Amongst them was Kolokotronis' wife dressed as a man.

References

Populated places in Laconia
Populated places in the Mani Peninsula
East Mani